Zulfat Irekovich Garaev (born 12 January 2000) is a Russian weightlifter. He won the bronze medal in the men's 67 kg event at the 2021 World Weightlifting Championships held in Tashkent, Uzbekistan.

Career 

In 2021, he finished in 4th place in the men's 67 kg event at the European Weightlifting Championships held in Moscow, Russia.

He won the gold medal in his event at the 2021 European Junior & U23 Weightlifting Championships held in Rovaniemi, Finland.

Achievements

References

External links 
 

Living people
2000 births
People from Naberezhnye Chelny
Russian male weightlifters
World Weightlifting Championships medalists
Sportspeople from Tatarstan